Trechus korbi is a species of ground beetle in the subfamily Trechinae. It was described by Reitter in 1903.

References

korbi
Beetles described in 1903